Robin Drysdale and Van Winitsky were the defending champions but only Winitsky competed that year with Patricio Rodríguez.

Rodríguez and Winitsky lost in the first round to Colin Dowdeswell and Peter McNamara.

Ion Țiriac and Guillermo Vilas won in the final 6–4, 7–6 against John Sadri and Tim Wilkison.

Seeds
Champion seeds are indicated in bold text while text in italics indicates the round in which those seeds were eliminated.

Draw

Final

Top half

Bottom half

References

External links
 1979 Volvo International Doubles draw
 North Conway-1979 at ITFtennis.com

Doubles